The Kyuquot/Cheklesath First Nation or First Nations (officially Ka:'yu:'k't'h'/Che:k:tles7et'h' First Nation)  is a modern treaty government located on the west coast of Vancouver Island in British Columbia, Canada. It is a member of the Maa-nulth Treaty Society and the Nuu-chah-nulth Tribal Council.

Before 1951, Both the Kyuquot First Nation and the Cheklesath First Nation were separately managed and funded by the then Department of Indian and Northern Affairs. The Cheklesath people were very few in numbers and were not receiving adequate funding for housing and infrastructure from the federal government's Department of Indian and Northern Affairs.

The Chekleset chiefs and elders met with the Kyuquot chiefs and elders to ask if their people could live amongst the Kyuquot people. The Kyuquot chiefs and elders agreed to allow the Cheklesath to live on Č'axwataqt (Mission Island), but were not granted any rights in Kyuquot affairs. They were to remain a separate nation until conditions warranted their return to their own territory.

See also
Checleset Bay
Kyuquot, British Columbia
Kyuquot Sound
Nuu-chah-nulth people
Nuu-chah-nulth language

References

External links
Nuu-chah-nulth Tribal Council

Nuu-chah-nulth governments
Kyuquot Sound region